Grandma Lake Wetlands State Natural Area is a Wisconsin Department of Natural Resources-designated State Natural Area featuring the undeveloped, pristine 44-acre Grandma Lake, which lies in a depression formed during the last glacial period. The lake is ringed by a large, open sphagnum bog mat. The bog mat is surrounded by a coniferous swamp of tamarack (Larix laricina) and black spruce (Picea mariana). The bog mat supports a plant community that is considered diverse and unusual, with several rare species present, including: bog arrow-grass (Triglochin maritima), dragon's mouth orchid (Arethusa bulbosa), livid sedge (Carex livida), small-headed bog sedge (Carex tenuiflora), as well as one of only a few known populations of bog rush (Juncus stygius) in the State of Wisconsin. In 1991, the US Forest Service designated the site as a Research Natural Area. Also, the site is listed as one of Wisconsin's Wetland Gems, by the Wisconsin Wetlands Association.

Location and access 
Access is via a walking trail that leads west from Grandma Lake Road, approximately 0.5 miles south of its intersection with Tie Mill Road. A small, brown breeding bird survey fencepost marks the trailhead.

References

External links 
Grandma Lake Wetlands Research Natural Area
Grandma Lake
Grandma Lake Wetlands State Natural Area
Google Map of Grandma Lake Wetlands State Natural Area

Protected areas established in 1996
Protected areas of Florence County, Wisconsin
State Natural Areas of Wisconsin
Bogs of Wisconsin
Lakes of Florence County, Wisconsin
1996 establishments in Wisconsin